The Home for Hebrew Infants was an orphanage established in the Bronx in 1895 to care for Jewish babies from infancy to up to five years of age, those too young to be housed with older children. Its goal was to support the health of those in its care and prevent child mortality. The Home merged with the Jewish Child Care Association in 1942.

Initially called the Hebrew Infant Asylum, the name was changed in 1914 to reflect how the institution was more like a home.

A January 1918 advertisement by the Federation for the Support of Jewish Philanthropic Societies encouraged financial donations to support any of 84 institutions, including the Home, which was described as a child caring society caring for 386 infants per day. 

Simon F Bleyer served as a director of the Home for 25 years and treasurer for 15 years. His death was the topic of a special meeting of the Home's directors on 8 June 1922 and memorialized in The New York Herald the following day. 

The Home offered maternity training to expectant and prospective mothers.  

The Home's new hospitalization building at West Kingbridge Road and University Avenue in the Bronx, New York, was dedicated on 10 May 1931. Aaron E Norman, President of the Home, was among the many speakers at the event.

References

1895 establishments in New York City
1942 disestablishments in New York (state)
Residential buildings completed in 1895
Organizations established in 1895
Organizations disestablished in 1942
Orphanages in New York (state)
Organizations based in the Bronx
Jewish orphanages
Jews and Judaism in the Bronx
Charities based in New York City
Residential buildings in the Bronx
Kingsbridge Heights, Bronx